The Medal of Peace Mission is a military decoration awarded by the Central Military Commission of China.

Criteria 
The medal is awarded to military officers, civilian cadres and soldiers who have served in international military activities, such as the United Nations peacekeeping operations, national anti-terrorism/military drills, foreign aid activities, etc.

Service Ribbon

References 

Awards established in 2011
Orders, decorations, and medals of the People's Republic of China